The TCM Classic Shorts Film Competition was set up in 2000.

2006

2005

2004

2003

2002

2001

2000 

British film awards
Turner Classic Movies